Marshall is an unincorporated community in Marin County, California.

Marshall is located on the east shore of Tomales Bay. It has a population that is unknown. Its ZIP code is 94940.

The town is named after the Marshalls, four brothers who set up a dairying industry there in the 1850s. Starting in the 1870s, Marshall was a stop on the North Pacific Coast Railroad connecting Cazadero to the Sausalito ferry.

There is still some dairying in the area with Straus Family Creamery based there, but nowadays the town's major commerce is in oysters and clams, for which it is a center.  It also acts as a center for tourists visiting Tomales Bay and the neighboring Point Reyes Peninsula.

See also
Tomales Bay Oyster Company

References

Further reading

External links 
 Information and photographs about Marshall on the Beach California website
 Information about Marshall on the West Marin Chamber of Commerce website

Populated coastal places in California
Unincorporated communities in California
Unincorporated communities in Marin County, California
West Marin